Siddhartha Chatterjee is a Bengali actor, although he has not appeared in many films. He is best known for playing the role of Topshe in Satyajit Ray's films. He went on to become a qualified chartered accountant and currently is one of the founding members of the Bengali chain of restaurants called Bhojohari Manna. He is also an entrepreneur and heads of an investment advisory firm.

Chatterjee is a Chartered Accountant by profession.

Filmography
 1974 Sonar Kella
 1979 Joi Baba Felunath
 2009 Hitlist
 2009 Madly Bangali
 2017 Amar Aponjon
 2017 Posto
 2019 Bhooter Bhobisyot

References

External links
 
 

Bengali male actors
Living people
Male actors in Bengali cinema
Year of birth missing (living people)